Peyvast (also known as Peyvasteh and Peyvasteh-ye Bālā) is a village in Keshvar Rural District, Papi District, Khorramabad County, Lorestan Province, Iran. At the 2006 census, its population was 83, in 21 families.

References 

Towns and villages in Khorramabad County